CIDG can refer to:

CIDG-FM, a Canadian radio station
Civilian Irregular Defense Group, an irregular military unit used during the Vietnam War
Criminal Investigation and Detection Group, the primary investigation arm of the Philippine National Police